Rikki og mændene is a 1962 Danish drama film directed by Lau Lauritzen Jr. and Lisbeth Movin and starring Ghita Nørby.

Cast
Ghita Nørby as Rikki
Poul Reichhardt as Ole
Holger Juul Hansen as Peter
Preben Mahrt as Chris
Bodil Steen as Dorte
Bendt Rothe as Knud
Palle Huld as Pedersen
Kaspar Rostrup as Den unge mand
Knud Schrøder as Ubehagelig kunde
Poul Müller as Rikkis chef
Ebba Høeg as Prostitueret
Bjarne Forchhammer as Mand på huslejekontor
Hugo Herrestrup as Købmand
Bente Wienberg Hansen
Ole Wisborg as Inspektør i bar
Bodil Miller as Prostitueret
Gitte Lee as Prostitueret (as Gitte Kröncke)
Lisbeth Movin as Peters kone
Karin as Rikkis datter
Thorkil Lauritzen as George, bartender

External links

1962 films
1960s Danish-language films
1962 drama films
Films directed by Lau Lauritzen Jr.
Films directed by Lisbeth Movin
Films scored by Sven Gyldmark
ASA Filmudlejning films
Danish drama films